Anjali Bhimani (born August 30, 1974 in Cleveland, Ohio) is an American actress. She is best known for voicing Symmetra in the video game Overwatch and Rampart in the video game Apex Legends.

Early life
Bhimani was born in Cleveland, Ohio, the daughter of doctors Ela and Bharat Bhimani. She is of Indian descent and grew up in Orange County, California. She attended Northwestern University.

Career

Bhimani's long time collaboration with Mary Zimmerman began in 1997 when she appeared as an Indian princess in Mirror of the Invisible World, adapted from the 12th century Persian epic Haft Peykar. She played Greek mythological character Myrrha in Zimmerman-directed Metamorphoses world premiere produced by Lookingglass Theatre Company in 1998 and its Off-Broadway opening at the Second Stage Theatre in 2001. Drama critic Albert Williams, in his review for the Chicago Reader, called Bhimani a "stunning dancer". She made her Broadway debut when Metamorphoses opened at Circle in the Square Theatre (2002).

In 2004, Bhimani became an understudy for Ayesha Dharker and Madhur Jaffrey's characters in Andrew Lloyd Webber's musical Bombay Dreams. During the play's The Broadway Theatre production Dharker left the play and Bhimani took over her role. She appeared as The Sparrow in Czech opera Brundibár (2006). Quake, a play Bhimani co-produced and co-directed opened at the Open Fist Theatre Company's First Look Festival of New Plays in 2011. For The Jungle Book she re-teamed with Zimmerman and played the role of mother wolf in its 2013 Goodman Theatre production.

Bhimani has appeared in TV series including All My Children, Law & Order: Special Victims Unit, The Sopranos, Journeyman, Shark, Flight of the Conchords, and Modern Family. She voiced the character Symmetra in the first-person shooter video game Overwatch, and shared the 2016 Behind the Voice Actors Award for Best Vocal Ensemble in a Video Game with her co-voice actors for the game. In 2021, she guest starred on Exandria Unlimited, a spinoff of the web series Critical Role.

Filmography

Film

Television

Video games

Web series

References

External links 

 
 
 
 

Living people
American people of Indian descent
American actresses of Indian descent
American film actresses
American stage actresses
American television actresses
American video game actresses
American voice actresses
People from Cleveland
Place of birth missing (living people)
20th-century American actresses
21st-century American actresses
1974 births